The 1973 U.S. Open was the 73rd U.S. Open, held June 14–17 at Oakmont Country Club in Oakmont, Pennsylvania, a suburb northeast of Pittsburgh. In one of the finest performances in tournament history, Johnny Miller fired a record, 8-under-par 63 in the final round to win his first major championship, one stroke ahead of runner-up 

Jack Nicklaus, the winner at Oakmont eleven years earlier, was the favorite entering the championship. Daily admission on the weekend was ten dollars.

Course layout

Source:

Lengths of the course for previous major championships:

, par 71 - 1962 U.S. Open
, par 72 - 1953 U.S. Open
, par 72 - 1951 PGA Championship

, par 72 - 1935 U.S. Open
, par 72 - 1927 U.S. Open
, par 74 - 1922 PGA Championship
Before 1962, the first hole was played as a par 5.

Past champions in the field

Made the cut 

Source:

Missed the cut 

Source:

Round summaries

First round
Thursday, June 14, 1973

Underweight from recent surgeries, 1965 champion Gary Player shot 67 to lead by three strokes.

Second round
Friday, June 15, 1973

Player shot 70 for 137 to lead by one at the midway point.

Source:

Third round
Saturday, June 16, 1973

Source:

Final round
Sunday, June 17, 1973

Four players shared the 54-hole lead: Schlee, Jerry Heard, 1963 champion Julius Boros, and 1960 winner Arnold Palmer. After a 76 (+5) on Saturday, Miller started the final round six strokes back, in a four-way tie for 13th place at three strokes over par, and few gave him any chance of winning. Miller birdied the first four holes, but after a bogey at the eighth, it certainly did not appear like he was on the brink of the greatest round in U.S. Open history.

But he then birdied four of the next five holes, and after a par at 14 he was tied for the lead with Palmer, Boros, and Tom Weiskopf. After lipping out a  birdie putt at 18 (for a 62), Miller carded the first round of 63 in major championship history. Finishing over an hour ahead of the last pairing, Miller then waited to see if anyone would match him. Palmer fell out of contention with three consecutive bogeys to finish in a tie for fourth. Boros and Heard both shot 73 and finished in a tie for seventh. Only Schlee had a chance to tie Miller, but his 40-footer (12 m) for birdie at the last stayed out; he opened his round with a double bogey.

In shooting 63, Miller hit all 18 greens in regulation and needed 29 putts. Ten of his approach shots wound up within , while five were within . His score was even more remarkable given that only three other players managed to even break 70 on the day.

 Amateurs: Vinny Giles (+6), Gary Koch (+18)
Source:

Scorecard
Final round

Cumulative tournament scores, relative to par
{|class="wikitable" span = 50 style="font-size:85%;
|-
|style="background: Red;" width=10|
|Eagle
|style="background: Pink;" width=10|
|Birdie
|style="background: PaleGreen;" width=10|
|Bogey
|style="background: Green;" width=10|
|Double bogey
|}
Source:

Miller's final round
Johnny Miller's 63: club selection and results - June 17, 1973

Video
You Tube - Miller on 72nd hole - USGA (ABC broadcast)

References

External links
USGA Championship Database
USGA – A Round for the Ages: Johnny Miller in 1973 U.S. Open

U.S. Open (golf)
Golf in Pennsylvania
U.S. Open
U.S. Open (golf)
U.S. Open (golf)